The Youth Coalition for Organ Donation (The YCOD) is a multinational nonpartisan NY-based 501(c)(4) lobbying group formed with the goal of increasing the number of organ donations in the US. The YCOD promotes organ donation through various online campaigns, including social media messaging, news appearances, and public lobbying campaigns.

Formed in 2017 by Evan Roden, Henry McLaughlin, Grace Tapani, and Sage Sellers as students at a high school in Buffalo, NY, the group has grown to include former Erie County Executive Joel Giambra as a primary partner.

The YCOD has advocated for an opt-out system of organ donation in New York State, not currently a system used in any American State. Despite favorable media coverage, the group has not passed legislation in the 2021 Legislative Session.

Target members 
The Youth Coalition for Organ Donation has focused on Youth Engagement through leadership roles, general marketing campaigns, and website design. The YCOD's senior staff members and founders are high-school and college-aged.

Goals 
The Youth Coalition for Organ Donation advocates for comprehensive organ donation education in public high schools, starting in New York State. The YCOD also advocates for an opt-out system of organ donation, intending to increase the rate of Donation in New York State. Originally introduced in 2019 as A07954, the group drafted a bill aimed at accomplishing this goal

Notable Endorsements 

 Joel Giambra, Former Erie County Executive

Related Organizations 
Various organ donation advocacy groups exist in the United States, including the Organ Donation Advocacy Group.

Non-lobbying organizations also exist, which focuses on increasing awareness. These include One8Fifty, the Chris Klug Foundation, Donate Life Hollywood, and the Organ Donation and Transplantation Alliance.

Donate Life America, Donate Life New York State, and other advocacy groups have not yet partnered with the Coalition, despite public, non-adversarial statements about the organization (shown above).

References 

Organ donation